North Jakarta is one of the five administrative cities (kota administrasi) which form Special Capital Region of Jakarta, Indonesia. North Jakarta is not self-governed and does not have a city council, hence it is not classified as a proper municipality. It contains the entire coastal area within the Jakarta Special District. In North Jakarta, an area at the estuary of Ciliwung river was the main port for the kingdom of Tarumanegara, which later grew to become Jakarta. Many historic sites and artefacts of Jakarta can be found in North Jakarta. Both ports of Tanjung Priok and historic Sunda Kelapa are located in the city. The city, which covers an area of 139.99 km2, had 1,645,659 inhabitants at the 2010 census and 1,778,981 at the 2020 census. It has its administrative centre in Tanjung Priok.

North Jakarta contains some of Jakarta's original natural mangrove forests. As the city has developed, some of this mangrove forest was converted into urban areas. However, a reforestation project aimed at planting mangroves within an area of 400 hectares was enacted in 2011 and was scheduled to be finished in 2012. The main goal of the project was to minimize abrasion in the coastal area, especially around the Pantai Indah Kapuk area.

North Jakarta is bounded by Java Sea to the north; Bekasi to the east; West Jakarta, Central Jakarta and East Jakarta to the south; and Tangerang to the west.

History

The present-day city of Jakarta grew from the area which is now North Jakarta. In the 5th century, at the mouth of the Ciliwung-Angke River, the development began with the port city Sundapura (now near Tugu, Jakarta and Bekasi), which was the main port for the Kingdom of Tarumanegara under the leadership of King Mulawarman.

During the 16th century, the city, which covered only the area of what is now North Jakarta, was known as Jayakarta. The system of government in Jayakarta has been amended several times, including changes of rulers, and shifting borders of the administrative area. This area consisted of three forms of government: first, the city government which was controlled directly by the Lord of Jayakarta (the area of which is located in what is now the Port of Angke); second, the state government controlled by leaders inferior to the Lord of Jayakarta (the area of which is located in what is now Pasar Ikan and Kota; and third, the worldwide government (the area of which is located in what is now Tanjung Priok.

At the beginning of the 17th century, the area was controlled by Chinese and other native people who later had to submit to the Dutch East Indies.

In 1854, the Law of Comptabuliteit 1854 divided the Jakarta Bay area into three categories: the Voorsteden (the suburbs), Regentschap Batavia (the Regency of Batavia) and private areas (supervised by the Department of Security - Afdeling I)

The government system changed again in 1905. After the formation of Gemeente Batavia, the area around Jakarta Bay was transformed into Batavia District (kewedanan) which includes Penjaringan, Tanjung Priok, Meester Cornelis and Bekasi. Meanwhile, Tanjung Priok came to be under the control of Haven Directie Koninklijke Paketvaart-Maatschappij.

When Japan entered into the region, the form of the government changed into Shiku (district level), and so North Jakarta was divided into districts such as Shiku Penjaringan, Shiku Tanjung Priok and Shiku Bekasi.

After the formation of the Unitary Republic of Indonesia on August 17, 1945, Jakarta Bay was divided into several administrative regions, namely Kewedanan Penjaringan, Tanjung Priok and Bekasi. These three kawedanan are controlled by the mayorship of Jakarta Raya, which is a part of West Java.

In 1957, after the formation of the Kotapraja Jakarta Raya, the area of Jakarta Bay was transformed into the Kotamadya of Jakarta Utara or "City of North Jakarta".

Tourism
The government of North Jakarta planned for a rehabilitation of tourism in North Jakarta under the 12 Coastal Tourism Destinations of North Jakarta project (Indonesian: 12 Jalur Destinasi - Wisata Pesisir Jakarta Utara). The 12 chosen destinations are:
 Taman Margasatwa Muara Angke (Muara Angke Wildlife Sanctuary)
 Sentra Perikanan Muara Angke (Muara Angke Fishing Port)
 Pelabuhan Sunda Kelapa (Sunda Kelapa Harbor)
 Masjid Luar Batang (Luar Batang Mosque)
 Mangga Dua shopping district
Taman Impian Jaya Ancol
 Bahtera Jaya
 Stasiun Kereta Api Tanjung Priok (Tanjung Priok Station)
 Jakarta Islamic Center
 Cagar Budaya Rumah Si Pitung dan Masjid Al Alam (Si Pitung's House and Al Alam Mosque)
 Gereja Tugu (Tugu Church)
 Sentra Belanja Kelapa Gading (Kelapa Gading shopping center)

Districts
North Jakarta is subdivided into six districts (kecamatan), listed below with their areas and their populations at the 2010 census and according to the mid-2019 official estimates:

References

External links

  Official site
  Jasa pengiriman mobil